Catholic campus ministry is the practice of organizing and coordinating ministry or service of the Catholic Church on the campus of a school, college, or university. The activities of a Catholic campus ministry organization may entail the establishment of clubs, groups, and organizations, as well as the orchestration and execution of liturgies, retreats, or recollections.  In addition, a Catholic campus ministry organization may conduct religion classes, workshops, or seminars.  Some examples of Catholic campus ministry organizations include Newman Centers and the Catholic Student Association.  Many Catholic campus ministry programs exist today because of the efforts of Cardinal Saint John Henry Newman.

United States 
In the United States, there are five organizations that coordinate Catholic campus ministry programs throughout the country. They are: 

Campus Ministry Association (CCMA)
 National Catholic Student Coalition (NCSC)
 Evangelical Catholic
 Newman Connection
 Fellowship of Catholic University Students (FOCUS)

United Kingdom
Oxford University Newman Society

Catholic youth organizations
Catholic universities and colleges